Pavel Hak (born 1962 in Tábor) is a Czech author. He lives in France and writes in French.

Career
Exiled to France in 1986, he studied philosophy at the Sorbonne. He writes in French. He has published six books, Safari, Sniper, Lutte à mort, Trans (Trans won the Prix Wepler in 2006), Warax and Vomito negro though the second is the only one published in English translation. Sniper (2005) is a graphic account of genocide and torture in an unnamed country. It met with largely positive reviews on publication in the UK and the USA.

Bibliography 
 Safari (novel), Tristram, 2001
 Sniper (novel), Tristram, 2002
 Lutte à mort (theatre), Tristram, 2004
 Trans (novel), Seuil, 2006
 Warax (novel), Seuil, 2009
 Vomito negro (novel), Verdier, 2011

References

External links 
Review of Sniper
 www.pavelhak.com Pavel Hak website

1962 births
Living people
People from Tábor
20th-century French novelists
21st-century French novelists
Czech male writers
20th-century French dramatists and playwrights
French male novelists
20th-century French male writers
21st-century French male writers
University of Paris alumni